The crestless curassow (Mitu tomentosum) is a species of bird in the family Cracidae, the chachalacas, guans, and curassows. It is found in Brazil, Colombia, Guyana, and Venezuela.

Taxonomy and systematics

The crestless curassow was originally described in genus Crax but genetic data confirm that Mitu is a valid genus. The crestless curassow is monotypic.

Description

Males weigh  and females . It is mostly black with a dark blue to purplish gloss. Its belly and the tip of its tail are rich chestnut. Unlike most other curassows, it has no crest and no swelling on its red bill.

Distribution and habitat

The crestless curassow is found in eastern Colombia, southern Venezuela, northwestern Brazil, and southwestern Guyana. It mostly inhabits rainforest along rivers, though it is also found in gallery forest in the llanos of Colombia and Venezuela. It tends to favor areas with thick undergrowth.

Behavior

Feeding

The crestless curassow usually forages singly or in pairs but also very rarely in groups of up to 10. It mostly feeds on the ground. Its diet has not been studied but is reported to be almost entirely fallen fruits.

Breeding

The crestless curassow's breeding season appears to coincide with the rainy season. It places its nest low in trees and lays two eggs.

Vocalization

The crestless curassow's song is "a low humming or booming 'uuut ... uu-UU-uu-uhoot'", performed year round but more frequently in the breeding season. Its alarm call is a "series of sharp, reedy whistles, 'queet'".

Status

The IUCN originally assessed the crestless curassow as being of Least Concern but in 2012 reclassified it as Near Threatened. Its population is not known but is projected to decrease due to habitat fragmentation and hunting.

References

crestless curassow
crestless curassow
Birds of the Amazon Basin
Birds of the Colombian Amazon
Birds of the Venezuelan Amazon
Birds of the Guianas
crestless curassow
Taxonomy articles created by Polbot